Unholy Savior is the third full-length album by the heavy metal band Battle Beast, released in January 2015.

Track listing

Personnel

Battle Beast
 Noora Louhimo – lead vocals
 Anton Kabanen – lead guitar, backing vocals, production
 Juuso Soinio – rhythm guitar
 Eero Sipilä – bass, backing vocals
 Pyry Vikki – drums
 Janne Björkroth – keyboards, orchestration, backing vocals, co-production

Additional musicians 
 J-P Björkroth – flute on "Sea of Dreams"

Production 
Matias Kupiainen – mixing at 5by5 Studios
Mika Jussila – mastering at Finnvox Studios

References 

2015 albums
Battle Beast (band) albums
Nuclear Blast albums